Prashanta Nanda (born 2 May 1947) is an Indian director, actor and politician from the state of Odisha. He is currently a Member of Parliament at Rajya Sabha, the upper house of the Indian Parliament, for Odisha. He has worked in the Odia, Bengali and Hindi film industry extensively. He was also a former minister in Odisha state.

Early life
Prashanta Nanda was born in Cuttack, Odisha on 2 May 1947 to Kanchan and Jagannath Nanda.

He did his schooling from Ravenshaw Collegiate School. His B.Sc. from Ravenshaw College, M.A. and Ph.D from Utkal University, LL.B. from Madhusudan Law College, and have D.Litt. from MIT University, Pune.

From his childhood, he showed an interest in acting by participating in different dramas from his school days. He performed in a children’s program named Sishu Sansar for Cuttack's All India Radio with the character named Bulu.

Career
He started his acting career from early young age. While performing in a drama at Kala Vikash Kendra of Cuttack,  Kaviraj Krushna Chandra Tripathy and Dhira Biswal choose him for the Odia movie Dasyu Ratnakar.

As actor
In 1962, he debuted as a lead actor with Odia movie Nua Bou. His three movies, Nua Bou (1962), Matira Manisha (1966) and Adina Megha (1970) got three times National Film Award for Best Feature Film in Odia within just eight years. He has worked under veteran directors like Prabhat Mukherjee, Mrinal Sen, Amit Maitra.

As director
At first he has given direction to 1975 Odia movie Mamata. But due to his young age, the producer suggested not to disclose his name. So he has given veteran actor Byomkesh Tripathy's name in the credits.

The 1976 movie Shesha Shrabana became his directorial debut in the industry, where the versatile actress Mahasweta Ray made her debut with the movie. Movies like, Shesha Shrabana, Hisab Nikas, Balidan, Swapna Sagara, Maa O Mamata, Dora are some of his milestone classics for Odia film industry.

While screening of his film Shesha Shrabana at IFFI, New Delhi, Tarachand Barjatya of Rajshri Productions, approached him to make the movie in Hindi. Subsequently, Nanda directed and acted as male lead in Naiyya released in the year 1979 alongside Zarina Wahab and the veteran actor Amrish Puri.

The whole shooting of the movie Naiyya was done in the bank of Mahanadi near Cuttack. The film’s music was given by the legendary musician Ravindra Jain. He again collaborated with Rajshri Productions with movie Paheli. He has also given his direction in 1984 Hindi movie, Grahasthi starring Yogeeta Bali, Suresh Oberoi and Ashok Kumar.

The Odia movie Maa O Mamata, based on a short story written by him while he was in his 9th standard. His mother found out his story diary and showed to his father. They were worried about his future, because of the content of story written by a school going boy. For that they punished him.

Later, in 1980, Nanda made a movie named Maa O Mamata, where he was the lead actor along with Mahasweta Ray, Hemant Das and Anita Das. The movie was a blockbuster at that time. His father never saw his films, but by hearing a lot of appreciation from everyone’s mouth, he asked him about the movie and showed interest to watch it. After watching the movie, he was surprised and asked where he found this kind of story. In reply, Prashanta said, the story was the same as what he had written in that dairy in his childhood for which they had punished him and hid that dairy. After that, his father got emotional with happiness and told him, As a parent, sometimes we behave more protective towards our children, and we never want our child to go the wrong way but it is difficult to find what talents our child has gifted by god.

While sharing the story of Maa O Mamata, Nanda has shared one of the songs Jane Radha Jane Meera and some parts of the film with the veteran Bollywood actor Raj Kapoor. Later, the song lyrics and theme of the movie Maa O Mamata reflects in his 1985 film Ram Teri Ganga Maili.

In 2008, his film Jianta Bhoota was conferred Best Film on Environment Conservation/Preservation in 56th National Film Awards.

Actor-director duo Sidhant Mohapatra and Prashanta Nanda have given 8 all time blockbuster Movies to Ollywood.

In 2007, he awarded with the Lifetime achievement award in Odisha Filmfare Award.

As Politician
He was the Bharatiya Janata Party's (BJP) leader and Odisha state Vice President. He resigned from his membership in August 2007. After that he joined the Nationalist Congress Party and then became a member of Biju Janata Dal.

Charitable work
In 2013, it was announced that he had joined other Bollywood and international celebrities in the TeachAids initiative, a state-of-the-art approach to worldwide HIV prevention, developed at Stanford University.

Filmography

As a director

Actor

Music Director
 Ghara Sansara (1993)

Recognition
 In 1962 his debut movie Nua Bou was awarded National Film Awards.
 FitFat Bioscope award, 2005
 Odisha Filmfare Award, 2015 (Lifetime achievement)

Notes

External links

1947 births
Living people
People from Cuttack
People from Odisha
Odia film directors
Male actors in Odia cinema
State cabinet ministers of Odisha
Indian male film actors
20th-century Indian male actors
21st-century Indian male actors
Indian actor-politicians
Bharatiya Janata Party politicians from Odisha
Nationalist Congress Party politicians from Odisha
Biju Janata Dal politicians
Film directors from Odisha
Male actors from Odisha
20th-century Indian film directors
21st-century Indian film directors
Directors who won the Best Film on Environment Conservation/Preservation National Film Award